Sarli-ye Sofla (also Romanized as Sārlī-ye Soflá and Sārlī Soflá; also known as Sārlī-ye Pā’īn) is a village in Fajr Rural District, in the Central District of Gonbad-e Qabus County, Golestan Province, Iran. At the 2006 census, its population was 1,459, in 332 families.

References 

Populated places in Gonbad-e Kavus County